Spicy globe basil is a cultivar of Ocimum basilicum (sweet basil). Unlike some better known basils, it grows in the form of a tidy, compact bush, more suitable for gardens and small pots than most varieties. The small, densely growing leaves are used in the same way as the leaves of other sweet basil varieties.

References

Herbs
Ocimum